VAK or Vak may refer to:

 Våk, Våler, Østfold, Norway; a village
 Vāk, Hindu goddess of speech
 Chevak Airport, Alaska (IATA Code: VAK)
 VAK (Visual Auditory Kinesthetic), a system of learning styles in NLP (neuro-linguistic programming), see Representational systems (NLP)
 VAK (Vysshaya Attestacionnaya Komissiya),  the Higher Attestation Commission, the main academic degree awarding body in the USSR and Russia

See also

 VAC (disambiguation)
 Vack
 VAQ
 
 Vax (disambiguation)
 Vaks